Inselsberg can mean:

 Großer Inselsberg, a mountain in Thuringia, Germany
 Inselsberg transmitter, a former broadcast and TV transmitter on this mountain
 10245 Inselsberg, an asteroid named after the mountain